The 2024 NFL Draft will be the 89th annual meeting of National Football League (NFL) franchises to select newly eligible players. The draft is scheduled to be held in Detroit, Michigan.

Host city
Detroit was chosen as the host city on March 28, 2022. The city was chosen ahead of Green Bay and Washington, D.C.

Trades involving draft picks
In the explanations below (PD) indicates trades completed prior to the start of the draft (i.e. Pre–Draft), while (D) denotes trades that took place during the 2024 draft.

Round 1
Carolina → Chicago (PD). Carolina traded a first-round selection, 2023 first- and second-round selections (9th and 61st overall), a 2025 second-round selection, and wide receiver D. J. Moore to Chicago in exchange for a 2023 first-round selection (1st overall).
Cleveland → Houston (PD). Cleveland traded first- and fourth-round selections to Houston alongside 2022 first- and fourth-round selections, and 2023 first- and third-round selections in exchange for quarterback Deshaun Watson and a sixth-round selection.

Round 2
New Orleans → Philadelphia (PD). Philadelphia traded two 2022 first-round selections (16th and 19th overall) and a sixth-round selection (194th overall) to New Orleans in exchange for 2022 first, third, and seventh-round selections (18th, 101st, and 237th overall) as well as a 2023 first-round selection (10th overall) and a 2024 second-round selection.
Denver → New Orleans (PD). Denver traded their 2023 first-round selection (29th overall) and their 2024 second-round selection to New Orleans in exchange for Sean Payton and a 2024 third-round selection.

Round 3
Minnesota → Detroit (PD). Minnesota traded a third-round selection and 2023 second-round selection to Detroit in exchange for tight end T. J. Hockenson, a 2023 fourth-round selection, and a conditional 2024 fourth-round selection.
New Orleans → Denver (PD) See Round 2: New Orleans → Denver.

Round 4
Cleveland → Houston (PD). See Round 1: Cleveland → Houston.
Denver → NY Jets (PD). Denver traded a fourth-round selection to New York in exchange for defensive end Jacob Martin and a fifth-round selection.
Detroit → Minnesota (PD). See Round 3: Minnesota → Detroit.
Round 5: Jacksonville → Atlanta (PD). Jacksonville traded a fourth-round selection and a 2023 sixth-round selection, both conditional, to Atlanta in exchange for wide receiver Calvin Ridley. The 2023 selection can become a fifth-round pick if Ridley is reinstated. The 2024 selection becomes a third-round pick based on playing time and can be a second-round choice if he signs a long-term extension.
Miami → Denver (PD). Miami traded its 2023 first-round selection, a 2024 fourth-round selection, and running back Chase Edmonds to Denver in exchange for Bradley Chubb, and a 2025 fifth-round selection.

Round 5
Carolina → Cleveland (PD). Carolina traded a fifth-round selection to Cleveland in exchange for quarterback Baker Mayfield.
Minnesota → Philadelphia (PD). Minnesota traded a conditional fourth-round selection and 2023 seventh-round selection to Philadelphia in exchange for wide receiver Jalen Reagor.
NY Jets → Denver (PD). See Round 6: Denver → NY Jets.
San Francisco → Carolina (PD). Carolina received fifth round pick and as well as second, third, and fourth round picks in the 2023 draft in exchange for running back Christian McCaffrey.
Tennessee → Carolina (PD). Tennessee traded a fifth-round selection to Carolina in exchange for offensive lineman Dennis Daley and a seventh-round selection.

Round 6
Arizona → Carolina (PD). Arizona traded a sixth-round selection and a 2025 seventh-round selection to Carolina in exchange for wide receiver Robbie Anderson.
Carolina → Jacksonville (PD). Carolina traded a sixth-round selection and a 2023 seventh-round selection to Jacksonville in exchange for wide receiver Laviska Shenault.
Cleveland → Atlanta (PD). Cleveland traded a sixth-round selection to Atlanta in exchange for LB Deion Jones and a seventh-round selection.
Denver → LA Rams (PD). Denver traded a sixth-round selection to the Los Angeles Rams in exchange for linebacker Kenny Young and a seventh-round selection.
Houston → Cleveland (PD). See Round 1: Cleveland → Houston.
Las Vegas → New England (PD). Las Vegas traded a sixth-round selection to New England in exchange for offensive tackle Justin Herron and a seventh round pick.
Philadelphia → New Orleans (PD). Philadelphia traded a sixth-round pick and a 2023 fifth-round selection to New Orleans in exchange for safety C. J. Gardner-Johnson and a 2025 seventh-round selection.
Tennessee → Philadelphia (PD). Tennessee traded a sixth-round selection to Philadelphia in exchange for defensive back Ugo Amadi and a seventh-round selection.

Round 7
Atlanta → Cleveland (PD). See Round 6: Cleveland → Atlanta.
Carolina → Tennessee (PD). See Round 5: Tennessee → Carolina.
Chicago → New England (PD). Chicago traded a seventh-round selection to New England in exchange for wide receiver N'Keal Harry.
Kansas City → Houston (PD). Kansas City traded a conditional seventh-round selection to Houston in exchange for cornerback Lonnie Johnson Jr..
LA Rams → Denver (PD). See Round 6: Denver → LA Rams.
Las Vegas → Dallas (PD). Las Vegas traded Johnathan Hankins and a 2024 seventh-round selection to Dallas in exchange for 2023 sixth-round selection.
Minnesota → Las Vegas (PD). Minnesota traded a conditional seventh-round selection to Raiders in exchange for quarterback Nick Mullens.
New England → Las Vegas (PD). See Round 6: Las Vegas → New England.
New Orleans → Houston (PD). New Orleans traded a seventh-round selection to Houston in exchange for running back Mark Ingram II.
NY Jets → Baltimore (PD). Baltimore traded safety Chuck Clark to the New York Jets in exchange for a seventh-round selection.
Philadelphia → Tennessee (PD). See Round 6: Tennessee → Philadelphia.
Tennessee → Las Vegas (PD). Tennessee traded a conditional seventh-round selection to Las Vegas in exchange for safety Tyree Gillespie.

Forfeited picks
Miami forfeited its third-round selection as well as its 2023 first-round selection as punishment for violating the anti-tampering policy in conversations with quarterback Tom Brady and the agent for then-New Orleans Saints coach Sean Payton.

2020 Resolution JC-2A picks
Since the 2021 draft, the league, under 2020 Resolution JC-2A passed in November 2020, rewards teams for developing minority candidates for head coach and/or general manager positions. The resolution rewards teams whose minority candidates are hired away for one of those positions by awarding draft picks. These draft picks are at the end of the third round, after standard compensatory picks; if multiple teams qualify, they are awarded by draft order in the first round. These picks are in addition to, and have no impact on, the standard 32 compensatory picks. One pick was awarded for the 2024 draft pursuant to the resolution.
San Francisco received a third-round selection and a third 2023 third-round selection after Tennessee hired former 49ers director of player personnel Ran Carthon as general manager.

References
Trade references

General references

National Football League Draft
NFL Draft
American football in Detroit
Events in Detroit
NFL Draft
2020s in Detroit
NFL Draft